BTRX-246040, also known as LY-2940094, is a potent and selective nociceptin receptor antagonist which is under development by BlackThorn Therapeutics and Eli Lilly for the treatment of major depressive disorder (MDD). It has demonstrated proof-of-concept clinical efficacy for depression. As of 2017, it is in phase II clinical trials for the treatment of MDD. It was also under investigation for the treatment of alcoholism, and similarly reached phase II clinical studies for this indication, but development was discontinued.

See also
 List of investigational antidepressants
 J-113,397
 JTC-801
 SB-612,111

References

External links
 BTRX-246040 (LY-2940094) - AdisInsight

Nociceptin receptor antagonists
Synthetic opioids